Union Sportive de Sidi Kacem is a Moroccan football club currently playing in the second division and was founded in 1927. Most of the club's achievements came in the 1970s and 1980s after gaining promotion to the GNF 1 in 1967. The club plays at the Colonel Abdelkader Allam Stadium.

Honours

Moroccan Championship: 0
Second Place : 1970

Moroccan GNF 2 Championship: 2
1967, 1996

Moroccan GNFA 1 Championship: 1
2005

Coupe du Trône: 0
Runner-up : 1975, 1980

References

Football clubs in Morocco
1927 establishments in Morocco
Sports clubs in Morocco
Association football clubs established in 1927
Sidi Kacem Province